Paul Andrew Abberley (born March 1959) is the chief executive of Charles Stanley Group since December 19, 2014. Previously, he was the chief investment officer at Charles Stanley & Co. Limited since June 2014. Before that, he was head of investments at Aviva Investors and the chairman and CEO at Fischer Francis Trees & Watts UK Limited.

Abberley is a graduate of Keble College, Oxford and holds an MA in philosophy, politics and economics.

References 

1959 births
Living people
Alumni of Keble College, Oxford
English chief executives
Chief investment officers